Giancarlo Gallesi (25 January 1932 – 22 February 2022) was an Italian professional football player and manager.

Career
Born in Vigevano, Gallesi played as a goalkeeper for AC Milan, Genoa and Monza, making 13 appearances in Serie A and 26 appearances in Serie B. He later managed Vigevano and Mortara.

Personal life and death
Gallesi died in Mede on 22 February 2022, at the age of 90.

References

1932 births
2022 deaths
People from Vigevano
Italian footballers
Association football goalkeepers
A.C. Milan players
Genoa C.F.C. players
A.C. Monza players
Serie A players
Serie B players
Italian football managers
Vigevano Calcio managers
Footballers from Lombardy
Sportspeople from the Province of Pavia